Thursday is a day of the week.

Thursday may also refer to:

Film
 Thursday (film), a 1998 film directed by Skip Woods
 A Thursday, a 2022 Indian film directed by Behzad Khambata

Television
 "Thursday" (13 Reasons Why), an episode of 13 Reasons Why

Fictional characters
 Ruby Thursday, a fictional character in the Marvel Comics Universe
 Thursday Next, a fictional character in novels by Jasper Fforde
 Fred Thursday, a fictional character in the television series Endeavor

Music
 Thursday (band), an American post-hardcore band 
 Thursday (opera) (German: Donnerstag), an opera by Karlheinz Stockhausen from his Licht cycle

Albums
 Thursday (mixtape), a mixtape by The Weeknd

Songs
 "Thursday", a song from Blackbirds of 1939 written by Haber, Sachs, recorded by Count Basie And His Orchestra 1961 
 "Thursday" (Pet Shop Boys song), a song by the Pet Shop Boys
 "Thursday", a song by Morphine from Cure for Pain and also used in the soundtrack to the film Beavis and Butt-head
 "Thursday", a song by Country Joe and the Fish 1968 B-side of "Who Am I"
 "Thursday", a song by Jim Croce 1973 B-side of "Workin' At The Car Wash Blues"
 "Thursday", a song by Turning Point, 1991
 "Thursday", a song by The Puddle 1993
 "Thursday", single by The Features 2000
 "Thursday" (Jess Glynne song), 2018

Other uses
 Thursday October Christian I, first son of Fletcher Christian (leader of the historical mutiny on HMS Bounty)
 Thursday, West Virginia, a community in the United States
 Abergavenny Thursdays F.C., a Welsh football club
 Thursday Island, Queensland, Australia

See also